"Daybreak" is an uptempo pop song by Barry Manilow. It was composed by Manilow and Adrienne Anderson and first appeared on Manilow's 1976 studio album This One's for You.

The single version was recorded live with the female backup group Lady Flash. The song reached number 23 on the U.S. Billboard Hot 100 and number 7 on the Adult Contemporary chart.  On the Cash Box Top 100 it peaked at number 21 for two weeks.  It was a somewhat bigger hit in Canada, on both charts in which it appeared.  Billboard described the song as "lively, upbeat, [and] irresistibly buoyant." Record World said that it "has a bright, breezy pop flavor that will remind audiences of summer."

The song is prominently featured in the John Waters film Serial Mom (1994), starring Kathleen Turner.

Chart performance

Weekly charts

Year-end charts

References

External links
  (live)

1976 songs
1977 singles
Live singles
Barry Manilow songs
Songs written by Adrienne Anderson
Songs written by Barry Manilow
Song recordings produced by Ron Dante
Arista Records singles